Abu Dumbuya (born 29 January 1985) is a Sierra Leonean footballer who plays as a midfielder for East End Lions and the Sierra Leone national team. He was named in Sierra Leone's squad for the 2021 Africa Cup of Nations, which will be held in January and February 2022.

References

External links

1999 births
Living people
Sierra Leonean footballers
People from Freetown
Association football midfielders
F.C. Kallon players
Old Edwardians F.C. players
FC Johansen players
Wusum Stars players
East End Lions F.C. players
Sierra Leone international footballers
2021 Africa Cup of Nations players